Jīvitindriya (Sanskrit and Pali) is a Buddhist term translated as "life faculty" or "vitality". Jīvitindriya is identified as one of the seven universal mental factors within the Theravada abhidharma teachings. In this context, jīvitindriya is defined as a mental factor that sustains the life of the citta (mind) and other mental factors it accompanies. The  characteristic of jīvitindriya is said to be “ceaseless watching”.

Definition

Theravada
Bhikkhu Bodhi states:
There are two kinds of life faculty, the mental, which vitalizes the associated mental states, and the physical, which vitalizes material phenomena. The mental life faculty alone is intended as a cetasika. It has the characteristic of maintaining the associated mental states, the function of making them occur, manifestation as the establishing of their presence, and its proximate cause is the mental states to be maintained.

Mahayana
Within the Mahayana Buddhist teachings, there are a variety of definitions for jīvitindriya. The Dharmaskandhapadashastra (an early Abhidharma work of the Sarvastivadin school) defines jīvitindriya as: a faculty that persists, continues, maintains, animates, and operates what we called sentient beings.

Etymology
Jīvitaṃ means “life”, and indriya means “controlling faculty”.

See also
 Indriya
 Mental factors (Buddhism)
 Qi or Chi

References

Sources
 
 Nina van Gorkom (2010), Cetasikas, Zolag
 Soonil Hwang (2006), Metaphor and Literalism in Buddhism: The Doctrinal History of Nirvana, Routledge

External links
 Definition of jīvitindriya, Nina van Gorkom
 Definitions for jīvitindriya, Soonil Hwang

Mental factors in Buddhism